František Eduard Kohout (6 March 1889 – 25 October 1976) was a Czech stage, film actor and television actor.

Selected filmography
 Battalion (1937)
 The Magic House (1939)
 Nocturnal Butterfly (1941)
 Happy Journey (1943)
 The Avalanche (1946)
 Sign of the Anchor (1947)
 Bohemian Rapture (1947)
 Jan Hus (1954)
 The King of Kings (1963)
 The Cremator (1969)

References

Bibliography
 Mitchell, Charles P. The Great Composers Portrayed on Film, 1913 through 2002. McFarland, 2004.

External links

1889 births
1976 deaths
Czech male film actors
Czech male stage actors
Czech male television actors
Actors from České Budějovice